Thumatha muscula is a moth in the family Erebidae first described by Otto Staudinger in 1887. It is found in the Russian Far East (Middle Amur, Primorye) and Japan.

References

Nudariina
Moths described in 1887